Şule Gürbüz (born 1974) is a Turkish author, poet and clockmaker who has worked for the Directorate of National Palaces of Turkey since 1997. Her master in antique clockmaking is Recep Gürgen.

Awards 
 2011 Writers Union of Turkey Public Publishing Award, for her book Saat Kitabı
 2012 Oğuz Atay Story Award (Turkey), for her book Zamanın Farkında

Bibliography 
 Kambur, novel, Istanbul: İletişim Yayınları, 1992.
 Ağrıyınca Kar Yağıyor, poem, Istanbul: Mitos Yayınları, 1993.
 Ne Yaştadır Ne Başta Akıl Yoktur, play, Istanbul: Mitos Boyut Yayınları, 1993.
 Zamanın Farkında, story, Istanbul: İletişim Yayınları, 2011.
 Saat Kitabı, essay, Ankara: TBMM Millî Saraylar Daire Başkanlığı Yayınları, 2011.
 Coşkuyla Ölmek, story, Istanbul: İletişim Yayınları, 2012.
 Öyle miymiş?, novel, Istanbul: İletişim Yayınları, 2016.
 Kıyamet Emeklisi, novel, Istanbul: İletişim Yayınları, 2022

References 

1974 births
Living people
Istanbul University alumni
Alumni of the University of Cambridge
Writers from Istanbul
Turkish women poets
Turkish women novelists
Turkish non-fiction writers
Turkish female screenwriters
21st-century novelists
Turkish clockmakers
21st-century Turkish screenwriters